Euxoa rugifrons is a moth of the family Noctuidae. It is found in North Africa, including Tunisia, Algeria, Morocco and Libya.

Adults are on wing in September.

External links
Species info

Euxoa
Moths of Africa
Moths described in 1888